Eleanor Holt is a Canadian actress and voice actress who frequently works for Blue Water Studios in Calgary, Alberta.

Holt is also one of the founding members of the Evergreen Theatre in Calgary.

Roles
Banner of the Stars - Sobaash
Bibi Blocksberg - Barbara Blocksberg
Di Gi Charat Nyo! - Di Gi Charat Mama
Flame of Recca - Neon
Gregory Horror Show - Nurse Catherine
Hunter × Hunter 1999 version - Gon Freecss, Ging Freecss (child, episode 47)
Jubei-chan 2 - Mikage Tsumura
Mega Man X8 - Lumine, Optic Sunflower
Mega Man Powered Up - Cut Man
Mobile Fighter G Gundam - Cath Ronary
Tide-Line Blue - Secretary General Aoi
We Love Golf! - Leo
Zoids: Chaotic Century - Prince Rudolph Zeppelin III

References

External links

Elinor Holt at Crystal Acid

Year of birth missing (living people)
Canadian stage actresses
Canadian video game actresses
Canadian voice actresses
Living people